Dan L. Hendricks (born December 5, 1958, in Los Angeles, California) is an American Thoroughbred horse racing trainer.

Hendricks took out his trainer's license in 1987 after working for Richard Mandella for nine years. On July 7, 2004, Dan was paralyzed from the waist down as the result of a motocross accident at Perris, California. Six weeks later he returned to work in a wheelchair.

During 2005 and 2006 Hendricks trained Brother Derek to major wins, including the Santa Anita Derby.

References

1958 births
Living people
American horse trainers
People with paraplegia
Sportspeople from Los Angeles